Il proscritto is an 1842 opera by Saverio Mercadante to a libretto by Salvatore Cammarano based on the 1839 play Le proscrit by Frédéric Soulié. The premiere took place at the San Carlo Theatre in Naples on January 4, 1842.

It is scheduled for revival by Opera Rara 28 June 2022 at the Barbican Hall.

Plot
Il proscritto concerns a lost love and political treachery in Scotland during the rule of Oliver Cromwell.

Cast
Giorgio Argyll (tenor)
Arturo Murray (tenor)
Anna Ruthven (mezzo-soprano)
William Ruthven, her son (bass)
Odoardo Douglas (mezzo-soprano) and Malvina Douglas (soprano), children of Anna Ruthven's second marriage
Clara, Malvina's handmaid (mezzo-soprano)
Osvaldo, first among the guards of the castle (bass)
One of Cromwell's officers (bass)
Dames and knights of the Murray and Ruthven families, outlaws, castle guards, archers

References

Operas
1842 operas
Operas by Saverio Mercadante